Richson Simeon (born October 5, 1997) is an American-Marshallese sprinter. He competed in the men's 100 metres at the 2016 Summer Olympics.

Simeon lives in Sacramento, California. The Marshall Islands National Olympic Committee recruited him after watching a video of his high school football highlights; before the NOC contacted him, Simeon had never competed in a sprint. The Olympics were his fifth competitive race; while his time of 11.81 seconds was tied for the slowest in the men's 100 metres, it was a personal best for him.

International competitions

Personal Bests
Outdoor

References

External links
 

Living people
1997 births
People from Costa Mesa, California
Marshallese male sprinters
American male sprinters
Olympic track and field athletes of the Marshall Islands
Athletes (track and field) at the 2016 Summer Olympics